David Bradley (born 1954) is a Minnesota Chippewa artist. He is known for his sociopolitical critique of contemporary Native American art, and as an artist-activist battling art fraud among other concerns.

Personal life
Born in Minnesota in 1954, many of Bradley's early years were in the Minneapolis metropolitan area until his family was split up and redistributed, having fallen victim to the prevailing view of what constituted an adequate family. In 1970, he left Minnesota and began a journey starting in the Southwestern United States and taking him through Central and South America — where he lived for a year with Mayan Indians — before his return to the U.S where he spent time among the Navajo Indians in Arizona.  After receiving training at the Institute of American Indian Arts (IAIA), and went on to receive a Bachelor of Arts in Fine Arts from the College of Santa Fe in 1980.

David Bradley currently lives in Santa Fe, New Mexico.

In August 2011, Bradley was diagnosed with the motor neuron disease amyotrophic lateral sclerosis.  , Bradley's illness had progressed to the point that he could no longer conduct a spoken interview.

Artistic career

Early work

Activism

Works

References

Further reading
 Verzuh, Valerie K. Indian Country : The Art of David Bradley. Santa Fe : Museum of New Mexico Press, 2014.

External links
 Peabody Essex Museum
 Institute of American Indian Arts
 School For Advanced Research
 Peiper-Riegraf Collection
 Plains Art Museum
 Blue Rain Gallery

1954 births
Living people
Native American painters
People with motor neuron disease
Institute of American Indian Arts alumni
Artists from New Mexico
Artists from Minnesota